Fred Gifford Leebron is an American short story writer and novelist. He is the author of three novels, and a Professor of English at Gettysburg College.

Early life
Leebron graduated with an A.B. from the Woodrow Wilson School of Public and International Affairs at Princeton University in 1983 after completing an 193-page-long senior thesis titled "Gweilo: A Hong Kong Story." He subsequently earned master's degrees from Johns Hopkins University and the Iowa Writers' Workshop.

Career
Leebron taught at Stanford University. He is now a professor of English at Gettysburg College. He has co-authored a book on writing fiction and co-edited another book on postmodern literature.

Leebron is the author of short stories and three novels. He received the Pushcart Prize in 2000 and O. Henry Award in 2001 and the Pushcart Prize. He was also a Fulbright Scholar.

His first novel, Out West, is about two young adults whose lives have gone downhill. His second novel, Six Figures, is about a non-profit executive who has failed to become financially successful. Six Figures was adapted by director David Christensen as the 2005 film Six Figures.

Personal life
Leebron is married to Kathryn Rhett.

Works

Novels

Textbook

Anthology

References

Living people
Princeton University alumni
Johns Hopkins University alumni
Iowa Writers' Workshop alumni
Gettysburg College faculty
American male novelists
American short story writers
Novelists from Pennsylvania
Year of birth missing (living people)